Thereus oppia is a species of butterfly of the family Lycaenidae. It is found from Mexico to Costa Rica at a variety of elevations. Most localities where it occurs appear to be deciduous dry forest.

The larvae feed on Struthanthus orbicularis.

References

Butterflies described in 1887
Thereus
Butterflies of North America
Butterflies of Central America
Taxa named by Frederick DuCane Godman
Taxa named by Osbert Salvin